This list of fictional ungulates in literature is a subsidiary to the list of fictional ungulates and list of fictional animals. The list is restricted to notable ungulate (hooved) characters from various works of literature. This list includes deer, moose, cattle, giraffes, camels, donkeys, sheep, goats and zebras, but excluding horses, pachyderms and pigs, which are listed in separate lists.

Deer and moose

Equines

Horses

Donkeys

Zebras

Pachyderms (elephants, rhinoceroses, hippopotamuses)

Swine

Sheep and goats
 The Ram (Le Mouton), French literary fairy tale by author Madame d'Aulnoy, wherein a prince is cursed into a sheep form by a jealous fairy.

References

Fictional ungulates
Ungulates
Ungulates